Wrinch is a surname. Notable people with the surname include:

Dorothy Maud Wrinch (1894–1976), English mathematician and biochemist
Horace Cooper Wrinch (1866–1939), English-born Canadian physician and politician
Mary E. Wrinch (1877–1969), British-Canadian artist

English-language surnames